Pokcha is a rural locality (a selo) in Cherdynsky District, Perm Krai, Russia. The population was 776 as of 2010. There are 6 streets.

Geography 
Pokcha is located 6 km north of Cherdyn (the district's administrative centre) by road. Cherdyn is the nearest rural locality.

References 

Rural localities in Cherdynsky District